Tay is a township in Central Ontario, Canada, located in Simcoe County in the southern Georgian Bay region. The township was named in 1822 after a pet dog of Lady Sarah Maitland (1792–1873), wife of Sir Peregrine Maitland, Lieutenant Governor of Upper Canada. Two other adjoining townships were also named for her pet dogs, Tiny and Flos (now Springwater Township).

History
In 1994, under countywide municipal restructuring, the Villages of Port McNicoll and Victoria Harbour were amalgamated with Tay.

Communities
The township comprises the villages and rural hamlets of Ebenezer, Elliots Corners, Melduf, Mertzs Corners, Ogden's Beach, Old Fort, Paradise Point, Port McNicoll, Riverside, Sturgeon Bay, Triple Bay Park, Vasey, Victoria Harbour, Waubaushene and Waverley.

Demographics 

Notable people
 Amos Arbour - NHL, NHA hockey player, member of original Montreal Canadiens hockey club.
 Wayne Middaugh - World Champion Curling Skip
 Sherry Middaugh - Canadian Curling Skip
 Keith Waples - Famed driver of Standardbred horses and inductee into Canada's Sports Hall of Fame

See also
List of townships in Ontario

References

External links

Lower-tier municipalities in Ontario
Municipalities in Simcoe County
Township municipalities in Ontario